Sutherlin is a surname. Notable people with the surname include:

 John Sutherlin (born 1936), bridge player
 Peggy Sutherlin (born 1937), bridge player
 William T. Sutherlin (1822–1893), most famous for opening his home to Jefferson Davis and his cabinet the week before Robert E. Lee surrendered
 Sutherlin, Oregon